As A Sa is the first Mandarin studio album by Hong Kong pop singer Charlene Choi. It was released on June 15, 2010. The three singles are released from album: Would Love to Win Fight (a theme song for Taiwan drama Calling For Love) and a song Another Me (recorded for her first EP) in 2009. Third single was "Confidant". Album also contains opening song 2 - 1 for her Debut Album.

Background
In 2009, Choi start to record her first EP Another Me (released on October 15, 2009) and her first Mandarin studio album. The album, entitled As A Sa, was released on June 15, 2010. For a second time, album is released on June 16.

Track listing
"Would Love to Win Fight" (theme song for Calling For Love)
"Past Doesn't Smoke"
"Big Storm"
"Let Go"
"The Future May Not Come"
"Confidant"
"Willing to Love"
"Detached"
"2 - 1" (theme song for The Butterfly Lovers)
"Your Sweet Kiss"

Bonus Track
"Another Me"

Bonus DVD
"Would Love to Win Fight"
"Past Doesn't Smoke"
"Big Storm"
"Confidant"

References

External links
 http://mandarinfree.blogspot.com/2010/06/charlene-choi-new-album-as-sa.html
 http://www.yesasia.com/us/as-a-sa-cd-dvd/1022795077-0-0-0-en/info.html

2010 albums
Charlene Choi albums
Mandopop albums